Anzur Husanovich Ismailov (Uzbek Cyrillic: Анзур Ҳусан ўғли Исмоилов; born 21 April 1985) is an Uzbek footballer who plays as a center-back for FC AGMK and the Uzbekistan national football team.

Career
He previously played for FK Samarqand-Dinamo, Traktor Tashkent, Pakhtakor and Bunyodkor. On 7 February 2011 Anzur Ismailov completed his transfer to Chinese Super League side Changchun Yatai.

On 10 September 2013 Ismailov missed the tenth penalty in the penalty shoot-off against Jordan which saw Uzbekistan fail to qualify for the 2014 FIFA World Cup, while also making the only Uzbek goal of the match in the fifth minute. For over a decade he was an important part of the Uzbekistan squad.

International goals
Scores and results list Uzbekistan's goal tally first.

Doping ban
In October 2009, Ismailov was banned for three months for a tetrahydrocannabinol (cannabis) positive from a post match doping control on 17 June 2009.

See also
 List of men's footballers with 100 or more international caps

References

External links
 
 

1985 births
Living people
Uzbekistani footballers
Uzbekistan international footballers
Uzbekistani expatriate footballers
People from Samarkand
FC Bunyodkor players
Pakhtakor Tashkent FK players
Changchun Yatai F.C. players
Uzbekistani expatriate sportspeople in China
Expatriate footballers in China
2007 AFC Asian Cup players
2011 AFC Asian Cup players
2015 AFC Asian Cup players
FK Dinamo Samarqand players
Chinese Super League players
Uzbekistani sportspeople in doping cases
Doping cases in association football
Footballers at the 2006 Asian Games
Association football central defenders
2019 AFC Asian Cup players
Asian Games competitors for Uzbekistan
FIFA Century Club